"I Am the Very Model of a Modern Major-General" (often referred to as the "Major-General's Song" or "Modern Major-General's Song") is a patter song from Gilbert and Sullivan's 1879 comic opera The Pirates of Penzance. It has been called the most famous Gilbert and Sullivan patter song. Sung by Major-General Stanley at his first entrance, towards the end of Act I, the character introduces himself by presenting his résumé and admitting to a few shortcomings. The song satirises the idea of the "modern" educated British Army officer of the latter 19th century.

The song is replete with historical and cultural references, in which the Major-General describes his impressive and well-rounded education in non-military matters, but he says that his military knowledge has "only been brought down to the beginning of the century". The stage directions in the libretto state that at the end of each verse the Major-General is "bothered for a rhyme". Interpolated business occurs here, and in each case he finds a rhyme and finishes the verse with a flourish.

The piece is difficult to perform because of the fast pace and tongue-twisting nature of the lyrics.

Historical basis
The character of Major-General Stanley was widely taken to be a caricature of the popular general Sir Garnet Wolseley. The biographer Michael Ainger, however, doubts that Gilbert intended a caricature of Wolseley, identifying instead the older General Henry Turner, an uncle of Gilbert's wife whom Gilbert disliked, as a more likely inspiration for the satire. Nevertheless, in the original London production, George Grossmith imitated Wolseley's mannerisms and appearance, particularly his large moustache, and the audience recognised the allusion. Wolseley himself, according to his biographer, took no offence at the identification and sometimes sang "I am the very model of a modern Major-General" for the private amusement of his family and friends.

Lyrics

I am the very model of a modern Major-Gineral,
I've information vegetable, animal, and mineral,
I know the kings of England, and I quote the fights historical
From Marathon to Waterloo, in order categorical;
I'm very well acquainted, too, with matters mathematical,
I understand equations, both the simple and quadratical,
About binomial theorem I'm teeming with a lot o' news,
With many cheerful facts about the square of the hypotenuse.

I'm very good at integral and differential calculus;
I know the scientific names of beings animalculous:
In short, in matters vegetable, animal, and mineral,
I am the very model of a modern Major-Gineral.

I know our mythic history, King Arthur's and Sir Caradoc's;
I answer hard acrostics, I've a pretty taste for paradox,
I quote in elegiacs all the crimes of Heliogabalus,
In conics I can floor peculiarities parabolous;
I can tell undoubted Raphaels from Gerard Dows and Zoffanies,
I know the croaking chorus from The Frogs of Aristophanes!
Then I can hum a fugue of which I've heard the music's din afore,
And whistle all the airs from that infernal nonsense Pinafore.

Then I can write a washing bill in Babylonic cuneiform,
And tell you ev'ry detail of Caractacus's uniform:
In short, in matters vegetable, animal, and mineral,
I am the very model of a modern Major-Gineral.

In fact, when I know what is meant by "mamelon" and "ravelin",
When I can tell at sight a Mauser rifle from a javelin,
When such affairs as sorties and surprises I'm more wary at,
And when I know precisely what is meant by "commissariat",
When I have learnt what progress has been made in modern gunnery,
When I know more of tactics than a novice in a nunnery –
In short, when I've a smattering of elemental strategy –
You'll say a better Major-General has never sat a gee.

For my military knowledge, though I'm plucky and adventury,
Has only been brought down to the beginning of the century;
But still, in matters vegetable, animal, and mineral,
I am the very model of a modern Major-Gineral.

Notes:

In popular culture

Film references

The Pirate Movie, a 1982 modern musical parody of The Pirates of Penzance, features many songs from the opera, including this song. Contemporary references were introduced, as when the Major-General adds to the song "Man, I'm older than The Beatles, but I'm younger than The Rolling Stones." In the 1983 film Never Cry Wolf, the hero sings the song. Similarly, in the 2001 time-travel comedy Kate & Leopold, Leopold sings the song; however, the scene is anachronistic in that The Pirates of Penzance premiered in 1879, after Leopold had already left his own time of 1876. A nonsense pastiche of the song in 2017 film Despicable Me 3, sung by Minions, was uploaded to YouTube by Illumination Entertainment as a singalong challenge; the video has been viewed more than 18 million times.

Television references
The song, or parts of it, has been sung in numerous television programs. For example, The Muppet Show (season 3, episode 52) staged a duet of the song with guest host Gilda Radner and a  talking carrot. Radner had requested a seven-foot-tall talking parrot, but Kermit had difficulty reading her handwriting. In a short cutaway from the 2012 Family Guy episode "Killer Queen", Peter plays the Major-General in a community theater production and mumbles all through the opening verse of the song. The 2003 VeggieTales cartoon episode The Wonderful World of Auto-Tainment! features Archibald Asparagus singing the first verse of the song. In Season 2, Episode 13 of USA Network series In Plain Sight, "Let's Get It Ahn", WITSEC workers, Mary and Eleanor, sing along to the song while listening to it being played as hold music. In a Season 3 episode of Home Improvement, "Room for Change" (1994), Al Borland, believing that he is in a sound-proof booth, belts out the first stanza but is heard by everyone.

Other examples of television renditions of the song include the Babylon 5 episode "Atonement", sung by Marcus Cole to irritate fellow passenger Dr. Franklin; The Wind In The Willows episode "A Producer's Lot" (Series 3, Episode 11) sung by Mole (Richard Pearson); the Married... with Children episode "Peggy and the Pirates" (Season 7, Episode 18); the Star Trek: The Next Generation episode "Disaster" and the Star Trek: Short Treks episode "Q&A"; two episodes of Frasier, including "Fathers and Sons", where Martin joins in the song, singing, "With many awful facts about the scary hippopotamus!"; the Mad About You episode "Moody Blues" (Season 6, Episode 5); and the "Deep Space Homer" episode of The Simpsons. Sometimes the song is used in an audition situation. For example, in the Two and a Half Men episode "And the Plot Moistens" (Season 3, Episode 21), Alan sings the first verse of the song to persuade Jake to join the school musical. Similarly, in season 2 of Slings & Arrows, Richard Smith-Jones uses the song to audition for the festival's musical. In the pilot episode of 90210, Annie Wilson sings the beginning of the song in a flash back of her old school performance. In the first episode of the 2020 British miniseries Quiz, about the Charles Ingram cheating scandal, Ingram and another Army officer sing the Major-General's Song.

Parodies or pastiches of the song have been sung in a number of television programs. For example, the computer-animated series ReBoot ended the series (Episode 39: "End Prog") with a recap of the entire show's plot, set to the song's tune. The Studio 60 on the Sunset Strip episode "The Cold Open" (2006), the cast of Studio 60 opens with a parody: "We'll be the very model of a modern network TV show; we hope that you don't mind that our producer was caught doing blow". In Doctor Who and the Pirates, the Doctor (played by Colin Baker) sings, "I am the very model of a Gallifreyan buccaneer". Other songs, from Pirates, Pinafore and Ruddigore, are parodied. When he hosted Saturday Night Live, David Hyde Pierce's monologue was a parody of the song. In the Animaniacs short "H.M.S. Yakko", Yakko sings "I Am the Very Model of a Cartoon Individual". In the Scrubs episode "My Musical", the song is parodied in "The Rant Song" sung by Dr. Cox. In a 2011 GEICO commercial, a couple that wants to save money, but still listen to musicals, finds a roommate, dressed as the Major General, who awkwardly begins the song while dancing on a coffee table.

Other parodies and pastiches
The song has been widely parodied and pastiched, including by Tom Lehrer's "Elements Song", "The Unix Sysadmin Song", written for the book The Unix Companion by Harley Hahn, which replaces the military references with Unix trivia and one featured in comic No. 1052 on the webcomic xkcd in 2012. This comic then became the subject of numerous musical adaptations. "The Elements" inspired the "Boy Scout Merit Badge Song", listing all the merit badges that can be earned from the Boy Scouts of America In the video games Mass Effect 2 and Mass Effect 3, the character Dr. Mordin Solus sings a short pastiche version ("I Am the Very Model of a Scientist Salarian").

On the last night of The Proms in 2000, the outgoing conductor, Sir Andrew Davis, sang a pastiche of the song celebrating the festival. When Derek Pattinson retired as Secretary-General of the General Synod of the Church of England in 1990, a choir sang a variation on the Major-General's Song, with the line "He was the very model of a Secretary-General", in a meeting of the General Synod. In 2010, a parody version of the song was posted as an op-ed piece in the Richmond Times-Dispatch mocking actions of the Attorney General of Virginia, Ken Cuccinelli. In 2010, Ron Butler released a YouTube video pastiche of the song, in character as President Obama, that received more than 1.8 million views. A 2015 YouTube parody satirizing county clerk Kim Davis called "The Modern Fundamentalist" was distributed by media outlets.

The character George Washington, in the song "Right Hand Man" from the 2015 musical Hamilton by Lin-Manuel Miranda, refers to himself with irony as "The model of a modern major general", which he rhymes with "men are all" and "pedestal". Miranda commented: "I always felt like 'mineral' wasn't the best possible rhyme." Stephen Colbert opined that some verses of "Favorite Song" by rap artist Chance the Rapper (featuring Childish Gambino), utilize the same rhythm as the Major-General's Song. Randy Rainbow released a parody of the song in 2018 titled "A Very Stable Genius", which lampoons Donald Trump.

References
Notes

Sources

External links

Parodies:
Animaniacs episode HMS Yakko
Gilbert & Sullivan parodies
"I am the very model of a Usenet personality", by Tom Holt
Johns Hopkins University promo

1879 songs
Gilbert and Sullivan
Patter songs
Songs about science
Songs about military officers